The Line 1, Blue Line, also known as North–South Metro of the Kolkata Metro, is a rapid transit system serving South 24 Parganas, Kolkata and North 24 Parganas in Indian state of West Bengal. The line connects Dakshineswar and New Garia and uses   broad gauge rolling stock. It was the first underground railway to be built in India, with the first operations commencing in October 1984 and the full stretch that was initially planned being operational by February 1995. On 28 December 2010, it became the 17th zone of the Indian Railways. Being the country's first, and a completely indigenous process, the construction of the Kolkata Metro was more of a trial-and-error affair, in contrast to the Delhi Metro, which has seen the involvement of numerous international consultants. As a result, it took nearly 23 years to completely construct around  underground railway from Birpara up to Tollygunge Metro Station.

Public transport experts have suggested that the line be extended from Dakshineswar to Bally (where it can connect with local trains of the Howrah division of Eastern Railway) and eventually to Dankuni, an emerging industrial city.

History 

The laying of the founding stone was done in 1972, but actual construction of line 1 started only in 1978. Running of the first metro car on the line by 1984 was considered a great engineering challenge. Former railways minister A. B. A. Ghani Khan Chowdhury took a massive effort to perform it. The first section opened between Esplanade & Bhawanipore (now called Netaji Bhawan). First day Metro Railway Kolkata was started by Sri Tapan Kumar Nath and Sri Sanjay Sil. There were no connections of this stretch with the two depots at Dum Dum & Tollygunge (Now called Mahanayak Uttam Kumar). So metro cars had to be put down on the track near Esplanade by crane, by directly digging the road surface. Initially, only four-car trains were run until 1986. There were no magnetic gates or escalators at that time and ordinary revolving gates served as exits. The Metro too operated on only a single line. Two years later, line 1 extended up to Tollygunge, at the southern end. At the same time, the metro service was extended to the double line. Magnetic tickets and more entry gates were also introduced at that time. The number of compartments in each train was increased to eight.

Metro service was also started from Dum Dum, at the northern end, to Belgachia in parallel with the extension of the line to the south. But this short portion was not popular and the service was closed down to be restarted when the entire stretch along the north–south corridor was completed.

After 1986 many political incidents hampered the construction, and work almost stopped for nearly six years. After restarting work, the Dum Dum to Shyambazar metro service was started in 1994. This portion was served by four-car trains. Two months later, the Esplanade – Chandni Chowk section was opened and Chandni Chowk – Central section opened three months later. The service from Dum Dum to Tollygunge started in 1995, with Mahatma Gandhi Road metro station, opening in 1996. During this time, more magnetic gates and escalators were added and the revolving gates were slowly phased out.

In 2009, a large number of stations on Line 1 were renamed by then Minister of Railways Mamata Banerjee.

On 22 February 2021, the Noapara – Dakshineswar stretch was inaugurated by Prime Minister Narendra Modi.

Timeline 
The following dates represent the dates the section opened to the public, not the private inauguration.

List of stations (North to South) 

The stations of this Corridors are:

Alignment & interchanges 
Dakshineswar, Baranagar, Dum Dum, Park Street, Mahanayak Uttam Kumar, Netaji, Masterda Surya Sen, Gitanjali, Kavi Nazrul, Shahid Khudiram and Kavi Subhash have side platforms; all other stations have island platforms. Central and Noapara are exceptions as they have both platforms on the sides as well as in the centre. Dakshineswar, Baranagar, Dum Dum, Rabindra Sarovar & Kavi Subhash have connections to interchange with Kolkata Suburban Railway. Shyambazar, Mahatma Gandhi Road, Esplanade, Kalighat, Rabindra Sarobar & Mahanayak Uttam Kumar stations have connections to the tram network. EM Bypass can be accessed from the Shahid Khudiram metro station and Kavi Subhash metro station.

Extension up to New Garia (2010) 
Mamata Banerjee during her first tenure as the railway minister initiated the project of Tollygunge – Garia metro extension. During her second tenure (2009–2011) she inaugurated the extension, and also introduced new Air Conditioned rakes, manufactured indigenously at the Integral Coach Factory.

The new extension to Garia Bazar in the south opened to the public on 23 August 2009. The Garia Bazar station was named after Kavi Nazrul. A final extension, in the southern end, from Kavi Nazrul (Garia Bazar) to Kavi Subhash (New Garia) was inaugurated on 7 October 2010, bringing the total number of stations to 23. On the same day, two Air-Conditioned rakes were also pressed into service.

Extension up to Noapara (2013) and Dakshineswar (2021) 
The line was extended up to Noapara from Dum Dum on 10 July 2013. The line was further extended from Noapara to Dakshineswar (4.1 km) is now complete & operational. It will be met by a metro line from Barrackpore at Baranagar (12.5 km). Trial runs for this stretch started on 23 December 2020, after delay due to COVID-19 pandemic. The stretch was inaugurated on 22 February 2021 & commercial operations began from the following day.

The stations on this stretch are :

 Noapara
 Baranagar
 Dakshineswar

Features

Technical features 

Metro construction is of a very complex nature requiring the application of several new technologies in the fields of civil, electrical, signaling and telecommunication engineering. Indian engineers backed by their own experience and supplemented by their studies abroad adopted advanced technologies in the following fields for the first time in India.

 Cut and cover method of construction using diaphragm walls and sheet piles.
 Use of extensive decking to keep the traffic flowing over the cut while construction is in progress underneath.
 Shield tunneling using compressed air and airlocks.
 Ballastless track using elastic fastenings, rubber pads, epoxy mortar and nylon inserts.
 Air-conditioning and ventilation system for environmental control of stations and tunnels.
 Third Rail current collection system for traction.
 Underground substations with dry-type transformers and SF6 circuit breakers.
 Tunnel-Train VHF-radio communication system.
 Microprocessor-based train control and supervisory remote control system for substations.
 Automatic ticket vending and checking system.

Salient features

Rolling stock 

The whole fleet is vestibuled. Carbodies and mechanical components were made by ICF with electrical components made by NGEF, Bangalore. The fleet is unique in that it is the only railroad equipment in India with end-mounted cab doors (except for some of the WAG-6 series locomotives).

ICF has specifically designed, manufactured and supplied these cars for the first underground railway system. The special features incorporated are:
 Traction power supply through third rail current collection system.
 Automatic door opening/closing and continuous monitoring of the transit.
 Automatic Train Stop (ATS) system which will automatically apply the brakes in case of human failure.
 Automatic train operation (ATO) with the driver acting as the train supervisor (optional).
 A public address system is provided on the trains to announce approaching stations. A central dispatcher can contact any of the train crew and also make important announcements directly to passengers over the system.

With all these features, the design and manufacturing process of these cars to a very high standard of reliability and safety has been a challenge. This was achieved without any technical collaboration.

Reservation for women 
In 2008, the Kolkata Metro Railway experimented with the practice of reserving two entire compartments for women.

This system was found to be ineffective and caused inconvenience for a lot of commuters (including women) and the plan was eventually dropped by the metro authority. But a certain section of seats in each of the eight compartments is reserved for women.

Problems with this line 

The founder of Delhi Metro, E. Sreedharan said Indian Railways are not experts at urban transport, and misplanned the Kolkata metro from the beginning. A private company should run the metro and can bring it up to standard in five years.

Since Kolkata Metro is under Indian Railways, it can't take its own independent decisions. It has to rely on Indian Railways for everything (like rakes etc.).  The rakes are ordered directly from ICF without floating any global tenders. And ICF being inexperienced in manufacturing metro rakes, has delivered faulty rakes. Thus causing snags and accidents.

See also 
List of Kolkata metro stations
Kolkata Metro Rolling Stock
Trams in Kolkata
Kolkata Suburban Railway

References

External links 

Old Official Website for line 1
New Official Website for all lines

Kolkata Metro lines
Kolkata Metro